The 1924 Úrvalsdeild is a season of top-flight Icelandic football.

Overview
It was contested by 4 teams, and Víkingur won the championship.

League standings

Results

References

Úrvalsdeild karla (football) seasons
Iceland
Iceland
Urvalsdeild